Nuris was a Palestinian Arab village in the District of Jenin. In 1945, Nuris had 570 inhabitants.  It was depopulated during the 1948 War on 29 May 1948 under Operation Gideon. The Israeli moshav of Nurit was built on Nuris' village land in 1950.

Location
It was linked by dirt roads to the villages of Zir'in and Al-Mazar.

There were several springs north of Nuris, most importantly the 'Ain Jalut, one of the largest in Palestine.

History
Remains from the Bronze Age have been found here, as has pottery from the Byzantine era.

Nuris was referred to by the Crusaders as "Nurith." Nearby, the Mamluks defeated the Mongols in the Battle of Ain Jalut (1260).

Ottoman era
In 1517, the village was included in the Ottoman Empire with the rest of Palestine, and in the 1596 tax-records it appeared part of the nahiya (subdistrict) of Jenin under the liwa' (district) of Lajjun, with a population of 16 Muslim households; an estimated 88 persons. They paid a fixed tax rate of 25%  on a number of products, including wheat, barley, olives, and goats and beehives; a total of 7,500 akçe.

The village was captured and burned by Napoleon's troops, after the Battle of Mount Tabor in 1799.
Pierre Jacotin named the village Noures on his map from that campaign.

British traveller James Silk Buckingham visited the site in the early 19th century. Buckingham remarked that there were several other settlements in sight, "all inhabited by Mohammedans." In 1838 Edward Robinson noted Nuris during his travels in the region, located in the District of Jenin, also called "Haritheh esh-Shemaliyeh".

Nuris had an elementary school for boys, which was founded under the Ottomans in 1888, and a mosque. Some ancient ruins remained unexplored as of 1992.

British Mandate era
In the 1922 census of Palestine, conducted by the British Mandate authorities, Nuris had a population of 364, all Muslims.

Part of the area was acquired by the Jewish community as part of the Sursock Purchase. In 1921, the village reportedly had 38 tenant families, and 224 people out of a total population of 364 (1922 census) cultivated 5,500 dunums out of a village area of 27,018. That year, the Sursock family sold some of the village lands to the Palestine Land Development Company.
A group of 35 young Jews began to farm the land, which became the core of Kibbutz Ein Harod.

Some of the villagers of Nuris received monetary compensation and left the village. Those who remained leased a block of land for a period of six years with the opportunity to purchase when the lease expired. They paid rental at 6% of the published sale offer on the land, but later, at the request of the farmers in Nuris, this was changed to one-fifth of the total yield in agricultural output of the land. After the original six-year lease was up, reports in 1928 showed that no villagers had bought the land leased to them. The leases were extended for three years while the ownership was transferred to the Jewish National Fund. In 1921 the average farmer cultivated 24 dunums, by 1929 this had drastically reduced to 4.4, although the population grew significantly.
In the 1931 census, Nuris had a population of 429 people and a recorded 106 houses were located in the village.

In the 1945 statistics, Nuris had 570 Muslim inhabitants with 163 houses, although the area was much smaller than it had been before 1920, with an area of 6256 dunums. The inhabitants, were mainly employed in cereal farming, although some land was allocated to irrigation and growing olives.

1948 War and aftermath
On 19 April 1948, Palmach headquarters ordered the destruction of "enemy bases at Al-Mazar, Nuris and Zir'in". Israeli historian Benny Morris notes that destroying the villages was "part and parcel" of the Haganah operations at this time, however, he also writes that Nuris was not finally depopulated until the end of May.

Following the war the area was incorporated into the State of Israel. A moshav, Nurit, was established to the northwest of the village site in 1950.
Palestinian historian Walid Khalidi described the village in 1992: "The site, overgrown with pine and oak trees, is strewn with piles of stones. Part of the surrounding land is fenced in and is used as a grazing area, while another part is cultivated. Cactuses and olive and fig trees grow near the site."

References

Bibliography

  p. 125

External links
 Welcome To Nuris
 Nuris, Zochrot
 Survey of Western Palestine, Map 9: IAA, Wikimedia commons
 Nuris at Khalil Sakakini Cultural Center

Arab villages depopulated during the 1948 Arab–Israeli War
District of Jenin
Former populated places in the State of Palestine
Former populated places in Israel
1948 disestablishments in Mandatory Palestine